Leslie Fish is a folk musician, author, and anarchist political activist.

Music
Along with The DeHorn Crew, in 1976 she created the first commercial filk recording, Folk Songs for Folk Who Ain't Even Been Yet. Her second recording, Solar Sailors (1977) included the song "Banned from Argo", a comic song parodying Star Trek which has since spawned over 100 variants and parodies. These two albums (originally on vinyl) have recently been put back into print on joint CD, entitled Folk Songs for Solar Sailors. She recorded the comic song "Carmen Miranda's Ghost", which was the source for the short story anthology Carmen Miranda's Ghost Is Haunting Space Station Three, edited by Don Sakers (in which she has one story and the notes on the song). Her song "Hope Eyrie" is regarded by some as being as close to the anthem of American science fiction fandom as is possible in such a disparate group.

Fish often weaves Pagan and anarchist themes into her music. She has also set to music many poems by Rudyard Kipling. She is a popular guest at science fiction conventions, and she can often be seen at the large filksings with her distinctive 12-string guitar, "Monster", which Leslie says plays best when it is given good Scotch whisky.

Film
She sings (and makes several appearances) in the film Finding the Future: A Science Fiction Conversation, which makes extensive use of her music. She was interviewed and performed in Trekkies 2.

Political activism
Fish has been involved with numerous political causes, most notably anti-war activism during the Vietnam War, and is a longtime member of the Industrial Workers of the World, a fact referred to in several of her songs (e.g., "Wobblies from Space", "Leslie's Filks"). She is also well known as a gun-rights activist, and has asserted that private gun ownership is the only true protection of individual freedom (a topic touched on in several of her songs). Because of her distrust of the stability of modern society, she has in the past worked to organize groups for carrying on civilization after what she (at one time at least) considered the imminent collapse of the current society. Her album Firestorm was in large part meant as a set of instructions for surviving a nuclear war, on the reasoning that it would be easier to recall them if they were in lyric form.

On anarchism, Fish says: "What sort of anarchist future would I like to see? There's no reason for a government-free society to be nothing but agrarian, no reason at all that it couldn't be industrial and space-faring."

The character "Jenny Trout" in the science fiction novel Fallen Angels by Larry Niven, Jerry Pournelle, and Michael Flynn is clearly meant to be Fish, although Trout is portrayed as a Marxist.

Other activities
In addition to her work as a filk artist, Fish is also well known within the Star Trek fan community for her works of fan fiction, which include "Shelter" (1976), one of the first Kirk/Spock stories ever published, and the fan-published Star Trek novel The Weight. In Textual Poachers, a landmark study of fan communities, MIT's Henry Jenkins described Fish's anarchist-feminist Star Trek novel The Weight as a 'compelling narrative' 'remarkable in the scope and complexity of its conception, the precision of its execution, and the explicitness of its political orientation.'" Fish has also written original novels and short stories, both alone and in collaboration with C. J. Cherryh and others.  Fish's song, "Carmen Miranda's Ghost is Haunting Space Station Three," inspired a collection of short stories with the same title, edited by Don Sakers and featuring stories by Cherryh and Anne McCaffrey.

Fish is an avid roleplaying gamer, especially live-action role playing, or LARPing.  She has also been a member in the Society for Creative Anachronism (SCA) since the 1970s. Since 2007 she has been the driving force behind the establishment of Fan Haven, a  private park in Arizona meant to serve as a safe space for LARPers, Pagans, naturists, SCAdians, and other marginalized groups associated with fandom. However, representatives of the federal government has disputed the validity of the mining claim that she proposed to use to establish ownership.

While Fish rarely discusses her private life, she was in a romantic relationship with anarchist political activist Mary Frohman "from the late '60s through the early '80s." Together they were part of the Dehorn Crew, the house band for the IWW.  Fish has often asserted that bisexuality is the human norm, and that the pervasive sexual repression she sees in current society causes many of the current social ills. She married long-time friend Robert "Rasty Bob" Ralston on November 13, 2011.

One of Fish's personal projects is an ongoing attempt to breed domestic cats for intelligence and other traits, including polydactyly. She claims that her cats are about as intelligent as a six-year-old human child, except in regards to symbolic language.

Since 2013, Fish and Ralston have been working to develop a rare and endangered species orchard, according to a post written on Fish's own blog.

Albums
All Off Centaur Publications, Firebird Arts & Music and Wail Songs albums are cassettes; all Random Factors albums are CDs except as noted. All Off Centaur albums are out of print as of 1988 unless reissued; all Wail Songs albums are OOP (out of print) as of c. 1999. All Fish solo albums from Firebird are OOP as of 1995.

 Minus Ten and Counting 1983 (contributor) (Off Centaur) (Out of print)
(Fish appears as singer, player, composer and/or lyricist on most of the Off Centaur anthology tapes (including A Wolfrider's Reflections, reissued by Richard & Wendy Pini on their own label, also OOP), on many of the Firebird Mercedes Lackey anthology albums, and on a number of convention live albums from Conglomeration, DAG, Off Centaur, Wail Songs and others; she also appears on the anthology The Pegasus Winners ("Love Songs") (OOP).)
 Folk Songs for Folk Who Ain't Even Been Yet (with the Dehorn Crew), 1976 LP (T.J. Phoenix), 1991 tape (Firebird) (both OOP)
 Solar Sailors (with Dehorn Crew), 1977 LP (Bandersnatchi Press), 1989 tape (Firebird) (OOP)
 Folk Songs for Solar Sailors (with Dehorn Crew), 2002 (collection of above two; Random Factors)
 Skybound 1982 (Off Centaur) (OOP), 2005 (Random Factors)
 Cold Iron (Kipling), 1983, 1986 (Off Centaur, OOP), 1991 (Firebird, OOP), 2007 (Random Factors)
 The Undertaker's Horse (Kipling),1985 (Off Centaur), 1990 (Firebird) (both OOP
 Chickasaw Mountain, 1986 (Off Centaur), 1991 (Firebird) (OOP)
 It's Sister Jenny's Turn to Throw the Bomb, 1987 (Off Centaur), (c. 1992 Firebird w/1987 date) (OOP)
 Firestorm: Songs of the Third World War, 1989 (Firebird) (two slightly different versions, not noted in liner notes) (OOP)
 Leslie Fish...Live!, 1989 (Firebird) (OOP)
 Our Fathers of Old (with Joe Bethancourt) (1993 tape (OOP), 2002 CD (adds bonus tracks with Kristoph Klover) Random Factors)
 Serious Steel (with Joe Bethancourt), 1995 (tape & CD) (Random Factors)
 Smoked Fish and Friends (live, with four others), 1996 (Random Factors)
 Not Canned or Frozen, 1996 (Wail Songs) (OOP)
 Lock & Load, 2009 (Random Factors)
 Avalon Is Risen, 2012 (Prometheus Music)
 Sea of Dreams, 2022 (Prometheus Music)

Books
 A Dirge for Sabis (with C. J. Cherryh), collected in The Sword of Knowledge trilogy
 Offensive as Hell: The Joys of Jesus-Freak Bagging, nonfiction
 Of Elven Blood, fantasy-romance, from Jupiter Gardens Publishing

Short stories
The following short stories were produced as part of the Merovingen Nights series of science fiction books. The series was edited by C. J. Cherryh.

 "First Night Cruise" in Festival Moon
 "Guardian" in Festival Moon
 "War of the Unseen Worlds" in Fever Season
 "Treading the Maze" in Troubled Waters
 "Fair Game" in Smuggler's Gold
 "Run Silent, Run Cheap" in Divine Right
 "Walking on the Waves" in Flood Tide

The following short stories appeared in the War World series, a shared universe created by Jerry Pournelle:

 "Janesfort War" (with Frank Gasperik), in CoDominium: Revolt on War World
 "Nothing in Common", in War World: Discovery
 "To Win the Peace" (with Frank Gasperik), in War World: Takeover

 Fanzine article

Writing as F. Sigmund Mead, "A Summary of the Physiological Roots of Andorian Culture" (Journal of Xenoanthropology, June 2341), edited by Leslie Fish. Fictional article on Andorian culture first published in Sehlat's Roar No. 2, a Star Trek fanzine of the 1970s, published by Randy Ash.

Awards

Pegasus Awards
 1984: Best Original Filk Song—"Hope Eyrie"
 1986: Best Original Filk Song—"Witnesses' Waltz"
 1986: Best Female Filker
 1987: Best Writer/Composer
 1989: Best Fantasy Song—"Wind's Four-Quarters" (with Mercedes Lackey)
 1999: Best Hero Song—"A Toast For Unknown Heroes"
 2002: Best Song That Tells A Story—"Horsetamer's Daughter"
 2003: Best Classic Filk Song—"Banned from Argo"
 2005: Best Space Opera Song—"Signy Mallory" (with Mercedes Lackey)
 2005: Best Sword & Sorcery Song—"Threes" (with Mercedes Lackey)

Other awards

 2014 Prometheus Special Award for Novella (Tower of Horses) and Song ("The Horsetamer's Daughter").

References

External links
 Official website (inactive as of 2022-03-01)
 Blog
 "Excerpts from an autobiographical letter by Leslie Fish", Prometheus Music, 1992
 Pegasus Awards for Leslie Fish
 A Summary of the Physiological Roots of Andorian Culture
 "Hope Eyrie"—Apollo 11 tribute music video
 "Leslie Fish" article on Fanlore
 

Year of birth missing (living people)
20th-century births
Living people
American anarchists
American anti–Vietnam War activists
American women singer-songwriters
American feminist writers
American gun rights activists
American women writers
Anarcha-feminists

Feminist musicians
Filkers
Industrial Workers of the World members

Singer-songwriters from New Jersey
Sex worker activists in the United States
Sex-positive feminists
Survivalists
Writers from New Jersey
American modern pagans
Performers of modern pagan music
Women science fiction and fantasy writers
American speculative fiction writers
Star Trek fanfiction writers